The Pan American Race Walking Cup (Spanish: Copa Panamericana de Marcha) is a biennial race walking competition for athletes representing countries from the Americas, organized by the Association of Panamerican Athletics (APA). It was established in 1984 and has featured races for senior men and women, and for junior athletes. The women competed in the 10 km road race until 1996, and then switched to the 20 km road race. In addition, there are separate team competitions. The 2001 event was held in conjunction with the South American Race Walking Cup. In 2011, the organization of the event was transferred from the Pan American Athletics Commission, a subdivision of the Pan American Sports Organization (PASO), to the newly constituted APA.

The events between 1984 and 2007 are documented in great detail in Spanish (including many historical fotos) by then President of the Pan American Race Walking Committee Rubén Pedro Aguilera from Argentina and is available from the APA website.

History
During the 1983 Pan American Games in Caracas, Venezuela, the chief judge Palle Lassen from Denmark, then president of the IAAF race walking committee met with regional officials, namely the president of the Pan American Athletics Commission, Amadeo Francis from Puerto Rico, César Moreno Bravo from México, and Jerzy Hausleber, the famous Polish coach of the Mexican racewalkers, as well as Rubén Aguilera (Argentina), Francesco Alongi (USA), Julián Díaz Rodríguez (Cuba), José Clemente Gonçalves (Brazil), Luigi Giordano (Canada), Alfonso Marques de la Mora (México) and Oscar Suman Carrillo (Panamá). As a result, they proposed to create an international event to intensify the development of racewalking in the Americas. Further technical details for the future Pan American Race Walking Cup were cleared during the 1983 Ibero-American Championships in Athletics in Barcelona, Spain, later that year. Only one year later, the inaugural competition took place in Bucaramanga, Colombia. The site was chosen because its central location within the Americas, and moreover, race walking was already successfully practiced here.

Host cities

Results
Gold medal winners were published.  The results for the Mexican athletes were published by the Federation of Mexican Athletics Associations (FMAA).  On overview for the years 1984-2005 was given.  Further results were assembled from other sources.  More recently, complete results for the period 1984 to 2007 were published.

Men's results

20 kilometres men

†: In 2000, the Mexican Athletics Federation used the event as trials for the Olympic Games in Sydney. Cristian Berdeja from  started out of competition and came in third in 1:23.46.

50 kilometres men

†: In 2000 Germán Sánchez from  started out of competition and came in third in 3:48:06.
‡: In 2003, the medallists were extracted from the IAAF World Race Walking Challenge. Craig Barrett from  came in second in 3:51:15.

Women's results

10 kilometres women

†:In 1990, Marisela Chávez from  started out of competition and came in third in 46:48.

20 kilometres women

†: In 2000, Mara Ibáñez from  started out of competition and came in second in 1:34:52.

50 kilometres women

Junior (U-20) men's results

10 kilometres men U20

Junior (U-20) women's results

10 kilometres women U20

List of Records of the Pan American Race Walking Cup

Men

Women

Records in defunct events

Women's events

See also
IAAF World Race Walking Cup
European Race Walking Cup
South American Race Walking Championships
Asian Race Walking Championships
Oceania Race Walking Championships
Central American Race Walking Championships

References

External links
2015 results
gbrathletics.com
usatf
athlecac

 
Sport of athletics records
Recurring sporting events established in 1984
Racewalking
Biennial athletics competitions